James Alexander Angus  (born 15 February 1949 in Sydney) is an Australian pharmacologist.

He held the Chair in Pharmacology at the University of Melbourne from 1993 to 2003, and was the Dean of the Faculty of Medicine, Dentistry and Health Sciences at the University of Melbourne from 2003 to 2013.

He was elected a Fellow of the Australian Academy of Science (FAA) in 1996, awarded the Centenary Medal in 2001, and appointed an Officer of the Order of Australia in 2010. Angus was made an Honorary Fellow of the Australian Academy of Health and Medical Sciences in 2015.

He has been the Lieutenant-Governor of Victoria since 12 November 2021.

References

1949 births
Living people
Officers of the Order of Australia
Recipients of the Centenary Medal
Fellows of the Australian Academy of Science
Australian pharmacologists
Lieutenant-Governors of Victoria
University of Sydney alumni
Academic staff of the University of Melbourne